Knott Rigg is a fell at the head of the Newlands Valley in the English Lake District. It is situated some 8.5 kilometres south west of Keswick and has a modest height of 556 metres (1825 feet). Its name is derived from the Old English language and means “hill on a knobbly ridge”. Because of its moderate height, the fell fails to be listed on any significant hill lists but it does merit a separate chapter in Alfred Wainwright’s Pictorial Guide to the Lakeland Fells.

Topography
Knott Rigg is located on a four kilometre long ridge, which springs from Rigg Beck in the Newlands valley midway along its length and runs south westerly to conclude at Newlands Hause. The ridge also contains the adjoining fell of Ard Crags which stands 1.5 kilometres north east of Knott Rigg; both fells are usually climbed in combination with each other. Knott Rigg is steep sided, with the western flank falling away to the valley of Sail Beck, while the eastern side descends to the minor road between Keswick and Buttermere in the Newlands valley. The fell is best viewed from Newlands Hause, where it is seen as a sharp conical peak (although the highest point is not in view), or from Buttermere, from where a complete picture of the fell is seen (although it is rather distant).

Geology
The Ard Crags ridge is an example of the Buttermere Formation, an olistostrome of disrupted, sheared and folded mudstone, siltstone and sandstone. There are minor intrusions of basalt on Knott Rigg.

Ascents
The easiest ascent of Knott Rigg is started from the car park at Newlands Hause (grid reference ). This gives the advantage of starting at a height of 333 metres, giving an easy vertical ascent of just over 200 metres. An alternative start can be made from further down the Newlands valley, either at Keskadale Farm or Rigg Beck. The latter route goes over Ard Crags first before continuing to Knott Rigg.

Summit
The view from the summit is severely restricted by the surrounding higher hills of the Coledale and Buttermere Fells. However, there is a view to the east in the arc between Causey Pike and High Spy, which reveals views of the Skiddaw and Helvellyn ranges.

References 
 A Pictorial Guide to the Lakeland Fells,The North Western Fells:Alfred Wainwright: 
 Complete Lakeland Fells, Bill Birkett, 

Fells of the Lake District